The Looters is a 1955 American adventure film directed by Abner Biberman and written by Richard Alan Simmons. The film stars Rory Calhoun, Julie Adams, Ray Danton, Thomas Gomez, Frank Faylen and Russ Conway. The film was released in May 1955, by Universal Pictures.

Plot
A group of plane crash survivors try to find refuge in the Rocky Mountains of Colorado. Two mercenaries, Peter and Jesse, set out on their trail with the intention of bringing them to safety. But Peter is lured by the belongings left in the plane and plans a real robbery against the survivors with final elimination of all witnesses.

Cast        
Rory Calhoun as Jesse Hill
Julie Adams as Sheryl Gregory
Ray Danton as Pete Corder
Thomas Gomez as George Parkinson
Frank Faylen as Stan Leppich
Russ Conway as Maj. Knowles
John Stephenson as Lt. Jerry Stevenson
Rod Williams as Co-pilot

References

External links
 

1955 films
American adventure films
1955 adventure films
Universal Pictures films
Films directed by Abner Biberman
1950s English-language films
1950s American films
American black-and-white films